This is a list of Members of Parliament elected in the 1969 Northern Ireland general election.

All members of the Northern Ireland House of Commons elected at the 1969 Northern Ireland general election are listed.

Members

Changes
November 1969: Thomas Gormley resigned from the Nationalist Party to sit as an Independent Nationalist.
19 March 1970: Desmond Boal, William Craig, Norman Laird, John McQuade and Harry West expelled from the Ulster Unionist parliamentary party.
16 April 1970: Ian Paisley and William Beattie of the Protestant Unionist Party were elected in Bannside and South Antrim to replace Terence O'Neill and Richard Ferguson respectively.
21 August 1970: Ivan Cooper, Austin Currie, Paddy Devlin, Gerry Fitt, John Hume and Paddy O'Hanlon found the Social Democratic and Labour Party.
September 1970: Lloyd Hall-Thompson joins the Ulster Unionist Party
12 November 1970: John Dunn Laird of the Ulster Unionist Party was elected in Belfast St Anne's to replace his father, Norman Laird.
March 1971: Harry West re-admitted to the Ulster Unionist parliamentary party; Anne Dickson resigns from the Ulster Unionist Party.
30 October 1971: William Beattie, Desmond Boal, Ian Paisley and John McQuade founded the Democratic Unionist Party.
27 January 1972: John Laird and Robert James Mitchell expelled from the Ulster Unionist Party.
9 February 1972: William Craig founded the Ulster Vanguard movement.
1972: Thomas Columba Gormley, Robert Dodd McConnell, Phelim O'Neill and Robert Wilson Porter joined the Alliance Party of Northern Ireland.
10 October 1972: Robert Simpson resigned from the Ulster Unionist Party.

References

CAIN Web Service: Stormont General Election (NI) - Monday 24 February 1969
Biographies of Members of the Northern Ireland House of Commons

1969